Desert Mice is a 1959 British comedy film featuring Alfred Marks, Sid James, Dora Bryan, Irene Handl, John Le Mesurier and Liz Fraser. A group of ENSA entertainers with the British army in the North Africa desert during the Second World War thwart a Nazi plan.  The title is a play on the Desert Rats.

Plot

An ENSA group tours around North Africa entertaining British troops. One night, Bert hears the tune (with no words) for "Lily Marlene". He sets about writing a variety of lyrics to the tune. Attached to an intelligence unit they realise that when singing their words to the well-known tune some in the audience are singing in German, exposing them as spies.

Cast
 Alfred Marks as Major Poskett 
 Sid James as Bert Bennett 
 Dora Bryan as Gay Bennett 
 Dick Bentley as Gavin O'Toole 
 Joan Benham as Una O'Toole
 Reginald Beckwith as Fred 
 Irene Handl as Miss Patch 
 Kenneth Fortescue as Peter 
 Patricia Bredin as Susan 
 Liz Fraser as Edie 
 Marius Goring as German Major 
 Anthony Bushell as Plunkett
 George Rose as Popados
 Alan Tilvern as German Captain
 John Le Mesurier as Staff Colonel
 M. E. Clifton James as Field Marshal Montgomery

There is one big gaffe in the film, when in one of the lorry journeys you see a photo of Dave Mackay, of Spurs, stuck on the lorry canopy; clearly it dates from the 1959 period of the film, and not WW2, as 1959 was when Mackay began playing for Spurs Football team.

Critical reception
TV Guide called it a "Light little comedy." and Sky Cinema "A good-hearted, sporadically enjoyable tribute to ENSA," whilst noting "an enjoyable roster of familiar British character actors, headed by Sidney James, Dora Bryan, Reginald Beckwith, Irene Handl and Dick Bentley, all seen at near their best. Director Michael Relph's serious-minded talents are not entirely suited to this featherweight farce, although he does deliver some agreeably funny moments."

References

External links

1959 films
North African campaign films
Military humor in film
British comedy films
1959 comedy films
British black-and-white films
Films set in deserts
Films shot at British National Studios
1950s English-language films
1950s British films